Robert Ellis (3 February 1812 – 19 August 1875; sometimes spelt Elis), professionally known by his bardic name Cynddelw (after a 12th-century poet of the same name), was a Welsh language poet, editor, and lexicographer, born at Tyn y Meini, Bryndreiniog, Pen-y-Bont-Fawr in the old county of Montgomeryshire, Mid Wales.

He was also a Baptist minister: from 1836 to 1840 at Llanelian-yn-Rhos and Llanddulas, Denbighshire; from 1838 to 1840 Glyn Ceiriog in the Ceiriog Valley; from 1847 to 1862 at Tredegar, Monmouthshire; and from 1862 until his death in 1875, at Caernarfon.

His poem Yr Adgyfodiad was published in 1849, whilst he was a minister at Tredegar in the Sirhowy Valley. Many other poems, biographies, an autobiography, and a dictionary followed.  His dictionary, Geiriadur Cymreig Cymraeg, published in Caernarfon in 1868 was one of the first dictionaries to be published only in Welsh (rather than English and Welsh).

Sources
Welsh Biography Online

1812 births
1875 deaths
People from Montgomeryshire
Welsh-language poets
Welsh-language writers
19th-century Welsh writers
19th-century Welsh poets